Cocaine & Rhinestones is a podcast about country music history by Tyler Mahan Coe. The 14-episode first season debuted in October 2017. The show received acclaim, and in early 2018 was the top music podcast on iTunes.

Each episode focuses on some mystery about country music; first season topics included the controversy over Loretta Lynn's recording of "The Pill", the meaning of Merle Haggard's "Okie from Muskogee", and the musical relationship of the Louvin Brothers. The show's exhaustively researched episodes present a glimpse inside the machinery of country music, tell colorful stories about recording artists, songs, and songwriters, and evaluate competing versions of the truth. While the show is not overtly political, sexism in the country music industry is a recurring theme.

Episodes can be longer than 90 minutes, and each features a "liner notes" commentary segment at the end, with Coe providing "clarifications and corrections" as well as bibliographical information. In addition to hosting, Coe is the sole researcher, writer and producer, without outside sponsorship. Coe said each episode in Season 1 took "about 100 hours" to complete.

Coe is the son of country musician David Allan Coe and grew up in the industry. He was the rhythm guitarist for his father's band from the age of 15 until 2013, when the elder Coe fired the entire band "in a fit of pique". In 2013, Coe started working on the second season of the show, and was granted access to the archives of  the Country Music Hall of Fame. Season two, which focuses on George Jones, debuted in April 2021, with episodes being released every two weeks.

Episodes

Season One

Season Two

See also
 Music podcast
List of history podcasts

References

External links

Music podcasts
2017 podcast debuts
Audio podcasts
American podcasts